The year 2015 was the 3rd year in the history of the Absolute Championship Berkut, a mixed martial arts promotion based in Russia. 2015 started with Absolute Championship Berkut 13. It started broadcasting through a television agreement with Match TV.

ACB Grand Prix 2015 bracket

ACB Flyweight Grand Prix 2015 bracket

1Rasul Albaskhanov retired from the tournament, Albaskhanov missed weight, and the bout was canceled. Oskar Dolchin automatically advanced to the second round.

2Yunus Evloev withdrew from the tournament dud to illness, Mikael Silander automatically advanced to the second round.

ACB Bantamweight Grand Prix 2015 bracket

ACB Featherweight Grand Prix 2015 bracket

1Zaur Kasumov withdrew from the tournament due to Food Poisoning, Alexander Matmuratov automatically advance to the second round.

ACB Lightweight Grand Prix 2015 bracket
{{8TeamBracket-NoSeeds
| RD1=1st Round  
| RD2=Semifinals  
| RD3=Final   

| team-width=150
| score-width=20

| RD1-team1= Amirkhan Adaev
| RD1-score1=TKO
| RD1-team2= Marko Burušić
| RD1-score2=2r.

| RD1-team3= Dzhamal Magomedov  
| RD1-score3=3r.
| RD1-team4= Eduard Vartanyan   
| RD1-score4=DEC

| RD1-team5= Shamkhan Danaev   
| RD1-score5=TKO| RD1-team6= Oleg Misikov  
| RD1-score6=3r.

| RD1-team7= Ali Bagov 
| RD1-score7=SUB
| RD1-team8= Thiago Meller1
| RD1-score8=1r.

| RD2-team1= Amirkhan Adaev 
| RD2-score1=1r.
| RD2-team2= Eduard Vartanyan 
| RD2-score2=TKO

| RD2-team3= Jakub Kowalewicz2  
| RD2-score3=1r.
| RD2-team4= Ali Bagov
| RD2-score4=SUB

| RD3-team1= Eduard Vartanyan  
| RD3-score1=1r.
| RD3-team2= Ali Bagov
| RD3-score2=SUB
}}

1Mickaël Lebout retired from the Grand Prix when he sign with the UFC, was replaced by Muhammed Lawal.

2Shamkhan Danaev was injured and couldn't participate in the second round of the Grand Prix, and was subsequently replaced by Thiago Meller.

ACB Welterweight Grand Prix 2015 bracket

1Andrey Koshkin withdrew from the tournament, was replaced by Sergei Martynov.

ACB Middleweight Grand Prix 2015 bracket

ACB Light Heavyweight Grand Prix 2015 bracket

ACB Heavyweight Grand Prix 2015 bracket

List of events

Mixed martial arts

Kickboxing

ACB 13: Poland vs. RussiaAbsolute Championship Berkut 13: Poland vs. Russia was a mixed martial arts event held by Absolute Championship Berkut on January 31, 2015, at the Orlen Arena in Płock, Poland.

Results  

ACB 14: Grand Prix Berkut 2015 Stage 1Absolute Championship Berkut 14: Grand Prix Berkut 2015 Stage 1 was a mixed martial arts event held by Absolute Championship Berkut on February 28, 2015, at the Arena Coliseum in Grozny, Russia.

Results  

ACB 15: Grand Prix Berkut 2015 Stage 2Absolute Championship Berkut 15: Grand Prix Berkut 2015 Stage 2 was a mixed martial arts event held by Absolute Championship Berkut on March 21, 2015, at the Nalchik Sports Complex in Nalchik, Russia.

Results  

ACB 16: Grand Prix Berkut 2015 Stage 3Absolute Championship Berkut 16: Grand Prix Berkut 2015 Stage 3 was a mixed martial arts event held by Absolute Championship Berkut on April 17, 2015, at the Friendship Arena in Moscow, Russia.

Results  

ACB KB 1: Grand Prix Quarter-FinalsAbsolute Championship Berkut Kickboxing 1: Grand Prix Quarter-Finals was a Kickboxing event held by Absolute Championship Berkut on April 25, 2015, at the Arena Coliseum in Grozny, Russia. 

Results

ACB 17: Grand Prix Berkut 2015 Stage 4Absolute Championship Berkut 17: Grand Prix Berkut 2015 Stage 4 was a mixed martial arts event held by Absolute Championship Berkut on May 2, 2015, at the Arena Coliseum in Grozny, Russia.

Results  

ACB 18: Grand Prix Berkut 2015 Stage 5Absolute Championship Berkut 18: Grand Prix Berkut 2015 Stage 5 was a mixed martial arts event held by Absolute Championship Berkut on May 23, 2015, at the Arena Coliseum in Grozny, Russia.

Results  

ACB 19: Baltic ChallengeAbsolute Championship Berkut 19: Baltic Challenge was a mixed martial arts event held by Absolute Championship Berkut on May 30, 2015, at the Amber Arena in Kaliningrad, Russia.

Results  

ACB 20: SochiAbsolute Championship Berkut 20: Sochi was a mixed martial arts event held by Absolute Championship Berkut on June 14, 2015, at the Bolshoy Ice Dome in Sochi, Russia.

Results  

ACB 21: Young Eagles 1Absolute Championship Berkut 21: Young Eagles 1 was a mixed martial arts event held by Absolute Championship Berkut on August 29, 2015, at the Arena Coliseum in Grozny, Russia.

Results  

ACB 22: Grand Prix 2015 Finals Stage 1Absolute Championship Berkut 22: Grand Prix 2015 Finals Stage 1 was a mixed martial arts event held by Absolute Championship Berkut on September 12, 2015, at the Ice Palace in Saint Petersburg Russia.

Results  

ACB KB 2: Grand Prix Semi-FinalsAbsolute Championship Berkut Kickboxing 2: Grand Prix Semi-Finals was a Kickboxing event held by Absolute Championship Berkut on September 27, 2015, at the Vityaz Ice Palace in Anapa, Russia. 

Results

ACB 23: Young Eagles 2Absolute Championship Berkut 23: Young Eagles 2 was a mixed martial arts event held by Absolute Championship Berkut on October 10, 2015, at the Arena Coliseum in Grozny, Russia.

Results  

ACB KB 3: Grand Prix FinalAbsolute Championship Berkut Kickboxing 3: Grand Prix Final was a Kickboxing event held by Absolute Championship Berkut on October 16, 2015, at the Sala Transilvania in Sibiu, Romania. 

Results

ACB 24: Grand Prix 2015 Finals Stage 2Absolute Championship Berkut 24: Grand Prix Berkut 2015 Finals Stage 2 was a mixed martial arts event held by Absolute Championship Berkut on October 24, 2015, at the Dynamo Palace of Sports in Krylatskoye in Moscow, Russia.

Results  

ACB 25: Young Eagles 3Absolute Championship Berkut 25: Young Eagles 3 was a mixed martial arts event held by Absolute Championship Berkut on November 7, 2015, at the Arena Coliseum in Grozny, Russia.

Results  

ACB KB 4: Grand Prix FinalAbsolute Championship Berkut Kickboxing 4: Grand Prix Final was a Kickboxing event held by Absolute Championship Berkut on November 13, 2015, at the Sukharev Sport Complex in Perm, Russia. 

Results

ACB 26: Grand Prix 2015 Finals Stage 3Absolute Championship Berkut 26: Grand Prix Berkut 2015 Finals Stage 3 was a mixed martial arts event held by Absolute Championship Berkut on November 28, 2015, at the Arena Coliseum in Grozny, Russia.

Results  

ACB 27: TajikistanAbsolute Championship Berkut 27: Tajikistan was a mixed martial arts event held by Absolute Championship Berkut on December 20, 2015, at the Sports Complex "20 Years of Independence" in Dushanbe, Tajikistan.

Results  

ACB 28: Young Eagles 4Absolute Championship Berkut 28: Young Eagles 4''''' was a mixed martial arts event held by Absolute Championship Berkut on December 27, 2015, at the Sports Complex "Gladiator", Lenin Plaza in Nalchik, Russia.

Results

References

Absolute Championship Akhmat
2015 in mixed martial arts
Absolute Championship Berkut events